The Vasse River is a river in the South West of Western Australia.

The headwaters of the river are in the Whicher Range below Chapman Hill and it flows in a northerly direction through the City of Busselton until discharging into the Vasse Estuary and then the Indian Ocean via Wonnerup Inlet and Geographe Bay.

The river is named after French seaman Thomas (Timothée) Vasse, who disappeared in the area in June 1801 during Nicolas Baudin's expedition.

It is estimated that 81.5% of the Vasse River catchment has been cleared.

See also
 Vasse and Wonnerup Floodgates

References

Rivers of the South West region
Busselton